Fings Ain't Wot They Used T'be is a 1960 West End musical comedy about Cockney low-life characters in the 1950s, including spivs, prostitutes, teddy-boys and corrupt policemen. The work is  more of a play with music than a conventional musical. The original play, by Frank Norman, who though born in Bristol lived his adult life in London, was intended to be a straight theatrical piece, but was supplemented with music and lyrics by Lionel Bart, who also grew up in London's East End.

Production background
Norman initially wrote the piece as a play (with no music), but after Joan Littlewood read it, she asked Bart to write the music and lyrics. It was first performed by Theatre Workshop, produced and directed by Littlewood in February 1959 at their home, the Theatre Royal Stratford East. It subsequently played at the Garrick Theatre in London's West End, starting on 11 February 1960. It ran for 886 performances. The cast featured Maurice Kaufmann, Wallas Eaton, Miriam Karlin, James Booth, Barbara Windsor, Toni Palmer, Bryan Pringle, Ray Ausin, Tom Chatto, Paddy Joyce, Edward Caddick, Yootha Joyce, George Sewell, Michael O'Brien, Rick Morgan, Louis Adams, Neville Munroe, Mary Davies, Mary Sheen, Barbara Cording, Donald Wilson, James Dark and Tamba Allen.

It was a Cockney comedy, and the dialogue is in the Cockney dialect with much rhyming slang and thieves' cant. Some audiences found it difficult to understand, and a list of more than a dozen phrases with standard English translations was supplied in the programme.

The characters in the play were a selection of the low-life of London; a collection of gamblers, spivs, prostitutes, teddy boys and girls and some not-too-honest police. The memorable title song, "Fings Ain't Wot They Used T'be", was recorded by Max Bygraves, albeit with heavily bowdlerised lyrics. An original cast recording was made, and was later re-released by Hallmark Records (710032).

Reviews were mixed. It was later noted that "A few reviewers praised the production on the whole but found the script too thin, while others found it entertaining but not as good as the company's previous productions." The play won the Evening Standard Award for Best Musical (1960).

Musical score
The original score and band parts for Fings Ain't Wot They Used T'be were lost sometime after its initial run. The only score which is now available comprises previously published song-copy versions of some of the musical numbers, along with handwritten material for the remaining songs. There are no band parts, and "Meatface" is not present in any form.

Whilst the show was playing at the Garrick Theatre, record producer Norman Newell collected British film, television, singing and stage stars to release an all star recording of the show. Tony Osborne provided musical direction, with John Barry and His Orchestra providing backing on two songs with Adam Faith. The cast included the author Lionel Bart himself, Alfie Bass, Adam Faith, Harry Fowler, Joan Heal, Sidney James, Alfred Marks, Marion Ryan, Tony Tanner, and the Williams Singers. The finale with the entire company also had vocals with "several celebrities present at the session" (according to the liner notes), including Glen Mason, Sean Connery, John Burgess, Pip Wedge, Jimmy Henney, Stella Tanner, and from the Garrick Theatre original cast, Miriam Karlin. The album was released in 1960 on the HMV label (CLP 1358).

References

Garrick Theatre Programme

External links
Fings Ain't Wot They Used T'Be on Ovrtur.com
Synopsis, Singing Principals, The Scenes, and Production at guidetomusicaltheatre.com

1960 musicals
West End musicals
Max Bygraves songs
British musicals